In enzymology, a chlordecone reductase is an enzyme that catalyzes the chemical reaction

chlordecone alcohol + NADP+  chlordecone + NADPH + H+

Thus, the two substrates of this enzyme are chlordecone alcohol and NADP+, whereas its 3 products are chlordecone, NADPH, and H+.

This enzyme belongs to the family of oxidoreductases, specifically those acting on the CH-OH group of donor with NAD+ or NADP+ as acceptor. The systematic name of this enzyme class is chlordecone-alcohol:NADP+ 2-oxidoreductase. This enzyme is also called CDR.

Structural studies

As of late 2007, only one structure has been solved for this class of enzymes, with the PDB accession code .

References

 

EC 1.1.1
NADPH-dependent enzymes
Enzymes of known structure